Riverside is a Liverpool City Council Ward in the Liverpool Riverside Parliamentary constituency. It contains a part of Toxteth, the Dingle and the southern part of the city centre. The population of the ward taken at the 2011 census was 18,422. It was formed for the 2004 Municipal elections from the former Abercromby and Dingle wards.

Councillors

The ward has returned six Councillors

 indicates seat up for re-election after boundary changes.

 indicates seat up for re-election.

 indicates change in affiliation.

 indicates seat up for re-election after casual vacancy.
Joe Anderson was elected as Mayor of Liverpool on 3rd May 2012 and thereby resigned his council seat.

Election results

Elections of the 2010s

Elections of the 2000s 

After the boundary change of 2004 the whole of Liverpool City Council faced election. Three Councillors were returned.

italics denotes the sitting Councillor
bold denotes the winning candidate

References

External links
Ward Profile - Riverside

Wards of Liverpool